Steinkjer Skiklubb is a Norwegian skiing club from Steinkjer.

It was founded on 22 December 1885 under the name Indtrøndelagens SF. The name was changed to Steinkjer SK on 19 November 1892. World-level ski jumper Anders Bardal is a member of the club. Other members include ski jumper Ole Marius Ingvaldsen, and cross-country skiers Morten Brørs, Liv Miriam Nordtømme, Kent Ove Clausen, and Arnstein Finstad.

Local rival teams are Henning SL and Skogn IL.

References
Official site 

Sports teams in Norway
Sports clubs established in 1885
Sport in Trøndelag
Steinkjer
Ski jumping clubs in Norway